Begelly is a village and parish in south Pembrokeshire, Wales,  north of Tenby on the A478 road. The parish includes the hamlets of Thomas Chapel  and Broom and has a web of small settlements associated with the 19th century anthracite mining industry. The parish, together with the parish of Reynalton and part (Kilgetty) of St. Issells, constitutes the community and ward of Kilgetty/Begelly. Begelly had a population of 761 in 2011.

Name
The placename appears to be Welsh, meaning "Bugail's territory".

History
Part of Little England beyond Wales, it has been essentially English-speaking for 900 years. The parish, recorded on a 1578 map as Begely, had an area of  (3.94 square miles). Its census populations were: 354 (1801): 779 (1851): 445 (1901): 346 (1951): 500 (1981).

The percentage of Welsh speakers was 3.5 (1891): 5.0 (1931): 4.5 (1971).

References

External links 
Begelly on Genuki
Photos of Begelly and surrounding area on geograph.org.uk
The Begelly War Memorial

Villages in Pembrokeshire